The Closer premiered on June 13, 2005 and concluded on August 13, 2012. Each season is organized around a central theme, which drives both the criminal plot and Brenda's personal storyline.  The crime story expands on an element of the theme, and often parallels or mirrors events in Brenda's personal life.

The series concluded with its seventh season. It contained 21 episodes, the final six of which transitioned the show into the continuation spin-off series, Major Crimes, with Mary McDonnell heading the cast as Captain Sharon Raydor.

Series overview

Episodes

Season 1 (2005)

Season 1 opens with the LAPD's new Priority Murder Squad (PMS), soon renamed the Priority Homicide Division (PHD), under the direction of Deputy Chief Brenda Leigh Johnson investigating the murder of a technological genius. Brenda has recently joined LAPD after a long career in law enforcement, including with the Atlanta and Washington, D.C., Police Departments. We soon learn Brenda is originally from Atlanta, Georgia, was CIA-trained, and was recruited by her former married lover, Assistant Chief Will Pope. Brenda is resented as an outsider by much of the LAPD and seen as an adversary by Robbery-Homicide's Captain Taylor, who initially persuades her squad to request transfers en masse in an unsuccessful effort to force Brenda's resignation. Brenda soon wins over her assistant, Sgt. David Gabriel, and the grudging admiration of the team when she shows them why she is called a closer; but her battle is far from over. As the season progresses, we see Brenda struggle to establish her authority and earn the respect of her squad, despite the efforts of Taylor and Detective Lt. Andy Flynn to both undermine her authority and hamper her investigations.  Slowly, one-by-one, Brenda wins over her team; and, by season's end, she has earned the loyalty of them all, even the hard-boiled Det. Flynn, as they stand united against Capt. Taylor's final attempt to remove Brenda from the squad.

According to James Duff, the theme for Season 1 is a woman alone largely in a man's world but also in a new city.  Brenda struggles to be taken seriously as leader of the PHD while establishing a new life in Los Angeles.

Season 2 (2006)

In Season 2, Brenda is now established as leader of Priority Homicide, with her team firmly behind her. 

The theme for Season 2 is partnerships, which is established as the opening episode explores a partnership within the LAPD and another in Brenda's life.  The theme plays out as the Flynn/Provenza partnership comes front and center early in the season and as Brenda's relationship with Gabriel grows and strengthens while she forms an uneasy working alliance with Commander Taylor.  At the same time, Brenda's romance with Fritz grows serious as they make the decision whether they should live together.

Season 3 (2007)

The theme for Season Three is family.  The PHD has now come together as a unified division, and their stories center on how they function as a family that must cope with a budget crisis.  Episodes this season explore issues of family, beginning with a tale of bigamy, and ending with two stories of family pitted against one another.  The season also explores the elements of family life in America, the secrets a family keeps and the horrors a family must face.  In Brenda's personal life, we, along with Fritz, meet her father for the first time, with some interesting results.  Brenda faces a personal health crisis even as her relationship with Fritz takes a large step forward.

{{Episode table |background=#8B0000|overall=3 |season=3 |title=19 |writer=19 |director=15 |airdate=14 |country=U.S. |viewers=9 |episodes=

{{Episode list
 | EpisodeNumber = 34
 | EpisodeNumber2 = 6
 | Title           = Dumb Luck
 | WrittenBy      = Duppy Demetrius
 | DirectedBy       = Elodie Keene
 | OriginalAirDate = 
 | Viewers = 7.29<ref>{{cite web|url=https://variety.com/2007/scene/markets-festivals/kitchen-gets-tasty-ratings-1117969528/|title=Review: Kitchen' gets tasty ratings'|last=Kissell|first=Rick|website=Variety|date=July 31, 2007|accessdate=April 2, 2015}}</ref>
 | ShortSummary    = A personal trainer is murdered while on a date with a married woman.   Brenda suspects that her possessive husband may have hired a hitman to kill the deceased.  However, the only witness to the murder is a valet parker diagnosed with OCD.  Brenda and Provenza have to solve the case on their own while the rest of the squad undergo anti-terrorist training. 
 | LineColor=8B0000
}}

}}

Season 4 (2008–09)

The theme for Season Four is power. Brenda and the Priority Homicide Division deal with the power of the media this season, when a Los Angeles Times reporter shadows them, but with an agenda all his own.  The power of the legal system, and those who both use and abuse it are explored throughout the season, as is the power that gun violence exerts on lives.  On the personal front, Brenda must confront the power plays that come as she and Fritz begin planning their wedding, with a bit of help from Clay and Willie Rae Johnson.

Unlike the previous three seasons, Season Four ran for 10 summer episodes, concluding September 15, 2008, and returned in January, 2009 with five additional episodes.

Season 5 (2009)

The theme for Season Five is change. Brenda must adapt to the changes that come, both as she begins a new life as a married woman, and when she loses her beloved Kitty. Also this season, the Priority Homicide Division must adjust to the loss of Det. Irene Daniels, as it settled into its new role as the Major Crimes Division (MCD). There's change in Lt. Provenza's life as well, when he becomes involved with a much-younger woman with some new ideas, much to Lt. Flynn's chagrin. Meanwhile, change isn't all good for Sgt. Gabriel, who pays the price for his role in Daniels' transfer. An officer-involved shooting brings a new figure into the lives of the MCD: the formidable Capt. Sharon Raydor of Force Investigation who is not at all impressed by Chief Johnson's approach to policing. We also learn a long-held secret: Lt. Provenza's first name.

Season 6 (2010–11)

The theme for Season Six is attraction.

Season 7 (2011–12)

The theme for Season Seven is love and loss. Throughout the season, events are overshadowed by a lawsuit against Deputy Chief Johnson over the events that transpired with Turrell Baylor at the conclusion of last season's "War Zone" (Season 6, episode 8). This season is also the final season of the series before story moves to the continuation spin-off series, Major Crimes''.

Notes

References

External links
 

Lists of American crime drama television series episodes
Lists of mystery television series episodes